Volanis is a surname. Notable people with the surname include:

Antonis Volanis (born 1948), Greek industrial designer
Sotis Volanis (born 1971), Greek singer